Gugeli (also Romanized as Gūgelī, Gowglī, Gūglī, Kūkelī, and Kowkelī; also known as Gugi) is a village in Takmaran Rural District, Sarhad District, Shirvan County, North Khorasan Province, Iran. At the 2006 census, its population was 306, in 75 families.

References 

Populated places in Shirvan County